Vítor Negrete (November 13, 1967 – May 19, 2006) was a mountaineer and the first Brazilian to reach the summit of Mount Everest without supplementary oxygen. He was also an adventure racer beginning in 2001.  Among many other adventures, he had crossed the Amazon Rainforest and traveled from São Paulo state to the southernmost part of Argentina– Tierra del Fuego, Patagonia– on a bicycle.  As a UNICAMP researcher in food engineering, he helped to introduce pre-industrialized food to poor communities in the Vale do Ribeira, south of the state of São Paulo. He first reached the summit of Mount Everest on June 2, 2005, again on May 18, 2006, this time without supplementary oxygen, and died on the descent.

Climbs
In 2005 Negrete summited Everest, using oxygen after Camp 3. He also summited Aconcagua in the Andes of South America.

Death on Everest

In May 2006, Negrete and his Brazilian teammate, Rodrigo Raineri, attempted to climb Mount Everest following the north ridge route without the aid of oxygen.  On May 16, they learned that, while making a summit bid, David Sharp, a fellow Asian Trekking member, had died on the mountain.

On May 17, resting at Base Camp after a failed summit bid, Negrete told Raineri: “I am going tonight, without O2, without a Sherpa and without a sat-phone, since the batteries of the one I have are almost gone. I am going completely on my own. I promise I’ll be careful." He called for help on the way down from the summit, which he had reached by noon on May 18. His Sherpa guide, Ang Dawa Sherpa, went immediately up from Camp III and helped him back down, where he died soon afterward.

See also
List of people who died climbing Mount Everest
List of Mount Everest summiters by number of times to the summit

References

External links
Report of Negrete's death
Portrait of Vitor Negrete

1967 births
2006 deaths
Brazilian explorers
Brazilian mountain climbers
Summiters of Mount Everest
People from Campinas
Brazilian people of Spanish descent
Mountaineering deaths on Mount Everest
People associated with the State University of Campinas